The arrondissement of Libourne is an arrondissement of France in the Gironde department in the Nouvelle-Aquitaine region. It has 129 communes.

Composition

The communes of the arrondissement of Libourne, and their INSEE codes, are:

 Abzac (33001)
 Les Artigues-de-Lussac (33014)
 Arveyres (33015)
 Asques (33016)
 Baron (33028)
 Bayas (33034)
 Belvès-de-Castillon (33045)
 Les Billaux (33052)
 Bonzac (33062)
 Bossugan (33064)
 Branne (33071)
 Cabara (33078)
 Cadarsac (33079)
 Cadillac-en-Fronsadais (33082)
 Camiac-et-Saint-Denis (33086)
 Camps-sur-l'Isle (33088)
 Caplong (33094)
 Castillon-la-Bataille (33108)
 Chamadelle (33124)
 Civrac-sur-Dordogne (33127)
 Coubeyrac (33133)
 Coutras (33138)
 Daignac (33147)
 Dardenac (33148)
 Doulezon (33153)
 Les Églisottes-et-Chalaures (33154)
 Espiet (33157)
 Eynesse (33160)
 Le Fieu (33166)
 Flaujagues (33168)
 Francs (33173)
 Fronsac (33174)
 Galgon (33179)
 Gardegan-et-Tourtirac (33181)
 Génissac (33185)
 Gensac (33186)
 Gours (33191)
 Grézillac (33194)
 Guillac (33196)
 Guîtres (33198)
 Izon (33207)
 Jugazan (33209)
 Juillac (33210)
 La Roquille (33360)
 Lagorce (33218)
 Lalande-de-Pomerol (33222)
 La Lande-de-Fronsac (33219)
 Lapouyade (33230)
 Les Lèves-et-Thoumeyragues (33242)
 Libourne (33243)
 Ligueux (33246)
 Lugaignac (33257)
 Lugon-et-l'Île-du-Carnay (33259)
 Lussac (33261)
 Maransin (33264)
 Margueron (33269)
 Montagne (33290)
 Mouillac (33295)
 Mouliets-et-Villemartin (33296)
 Moulon (33298)
 Naujan-et-Postiac (33301)
 Néac (33302)
 Nérigean (33303)
 Les Peintures (33315)
 Périssac (33317)
 Pessac-sur-Dordogne (33319)
 Petit-Palais-et-Cornemps (33320)
 Pineuilh (33324)
 Pomerol (33328)
 Porchères (33332)
 Puisseguin (33342)
 Pujols (33344)
 Puynormand (33347)
 Rauzan (33350)
 Riocaud (33354)
 La Rivière (33356)
 Sablons (33362)
 Saillans (33364)
 Saint-Aignan (33365)
 Saint-André-et-Appelles (33369)
 Saint-Antoine-sur-l'Isle (33373)
 Saint-Aubin-de-Branne (33375)
 Saint-Avit-de-Soulège (33377)
 Saint-Avit-Saint-Nazaire (33378)
 Saint-Christophe-de-Double (33385)
 Saint-Christophe-des-Bardes (33384)
 Saint-Cibard (33386)
 Saint-Ciers-d'Abzac (33387)
 Saint-Denis-de-Pile (33393)
 Sainte-Colombe (33390)
 Sainte-Florence (33401)
 Sainte-Foy-la-Grande (33402)
 Saint-Émilion (33394)
 Sainte-Radegonde (33468)
 Sainte-Terre (33485)
 Saint-Étienne-de-Lisse (33396)
 Saint-Genès-de-Castillon (33406)
 Saint-Genès-de-Fronsac (33407)
 Saint-Germain-de-la-Rivière (33414)
 Saint-Germain-du-Puch (33413)
 Saint-Hippolyte (33420)
 Saint-Jean-de-Blaignac (33421)
 Saint-Laurent-des-Combes (33426)
 Saint-Magne-de-Castillon (33437)
 Saint-Martin-de-Laye (33442)
 Saint-Martin-du-Bois (33445)
 Saint-Médard-de-Guizières (33447)
 Saint-Michel-de-Fronsac (33451)
 Saint-Pey-d'Armens (33459)
 Saint-Pey-de-Castets (33460)
 Saint-Philippe-d'Aiguille (33461)
 Saint-Philippe-du-Seignal (33462)
 Saint-Quentin-de-Baron (33466)
 Saint-Quentin-de-Caplong (33467)
 Saint-Romain-la-Virvée (33470)
 Saint-Sauveur-de-Puynormand (33472)
 Saint-Seurin-sur-l'Isle (33478)
 Saint-Sulpice-de-Faleyrens (33480)
 Saint-Vincent-de-Pertignas (33488)
 Les Salles-de-Castillon (33499)
 Savignac-de-l'Isle (33509)
 Tarnès (33524)
 Tayac (33526)
 Tizac-de-Curton (33531)
 Tizac-de-Lapouyade (33532)
 Vayres (33539)
 Vérac (33542)
 Vignonet (33546)
 Villegouge (33548)

History

The arrondissement of Libourne was created in 1800.

As a result of the reorganisation of the cantons of France which came into effect in 2015, the borders of the cantons are no longer related to the borders of the arrondissements. The cantons of the arrondissement of Libourne were, as of January 2015:

 Branne
 Castillon-la-Bataille
 Coutras
 Fronsac
 Guîtres
 Libourne
 Lussac
 Pujols
 Sainte-Foy-la-Grande

References

Libourne